Bodle Street Green is a small village in the civil parish of Warbleton, in the Wealden district of East Sussex, England.

Villages in East Sussex
Warbleton